Kanagawa 1st district (神奈川県第1区, Kanagawa-ken dai-ikku or 神奈川1区, Kanagawa ikku) is a single-member constituency of the House of Representatives, the lower house of the national Diet of Japan. It is located in eastern Kanagawa Prefecture and covers the central downtown and southeastern parts of the prefectural capital of Yokohama, namely the Naka (centre), Isogo and Kanazawa wards. It is among many other things home to the Yokohama city hall and the Kanagawa prefectural government building. As of December 1, 2020, 428,115 eligible voters were registered in the district.

Before the electoral reform of the 1990s the area had been split between the four-member 1st district and the five-member 4th district.

In the first post-reform election of 1996, the 1st district was mainly contested by Liberal Democrat Jun Matsumoto (Asō faction), a former member of the city council and newcomer in national politics, Democrat Ken'ichirō Satō (formerly LDP, Fukuda faction, then New Party Sakigake member in the 1990s), an incumbent for the pre-reform 4th district, and newcomer Masahiko Okabe for the New Frontier Party. Matsumoto narrowly won, but Satō kept a seat via the newly introduced proportional representation. In 2000, Satō beat Matsumoto who then also failed to win a proportional seat but retook the 1st district in the 2003 and 2005 general elections. Satō retired from politics in 2007, but in the national landslide Democratic victory of 2009, first time candidate Mieko Nakabayashi won the 1st district against Matsumoto. Matsumoto was Deputy Chief Cabinet Secretary in the Abe cabinet, Satō was chairman of the House of Representatives committee on the environment in the 1990s and chaired the disciplinary committee in 2004.

In the landslide Democratic defeat of 2012, Nakabayashi lost more than 84,000 votes compared to 2009. Matsumoto lost only less than 17,000 votes and regained the district. In February 2021, after it emerged that Matsumoto had visited a club in Ginza during a state of emergency due to the COVID-19 pandemic, he left the LDP and ran as an independent candidate in the 2021 election where he lost to CDP candidate Gō Shinohara.

List of members representing the district

Election results

2021

2017

2014

2012

2009

2005

2003

2000

1996

References 

Kanagawa Prefecture
Districts of the House of Representatives (Japan)
Yokohama